Falgore Game Reserve is protected ecosystem designated mainly for games protection in southern Kano State of northern Nigeria. This game reserve is located about 150 kilometers away from Kano city. It lies in Tudun Wada, Doguwa and Sumaila local government areas. It extends to the boundary line between Kano, Kaduna and Bauchi states respectively. It covers an area of about 1000 square kilometers and is traversed by the River Kano. Falgore game reserve lies on northern guinea savanna ecological belt. This ecosystem is bisected by River Kano. Falgore game reserve started as Kogin Kano forest reserve which was developed since the British colonial period in 1940s. The forest reserve was only upgraded  into a game reserve in the 1960s and subsequently called Falgore game reserve.

Ecological Functions
Falgore game reserve conserves the savanna floral faunal species within their natural habitat. However, one of the main objectives of the game reserve is to serve as regulator of silting and sedimentation which threatens the multipurpose Tiga Dam which is the backbone of the Kano River Project. The villages located around Falgore game reserve believe it offers them a good microclimate and protects them against destructive windstorms.

Socioeconomic function
Falgore game reserve has high potentials for the tourism and recreation industry of Kano State and Nigeria. Inside the reserve there are beautiful physical features of spellbinding attractions, which include a number of rocks and the beautiful rapids of the river Kano. That is expectedly a must site for photographic enthusiasts. Still within the park visitor can switch to culture as the ghost old town of Falgore, which is nearly as old as Kano City lie there with its traditional architecture, mode of settlement and other human features.
Accommodation and camping facilities are available around the game reserve. Additionally, during the wet season Falgore is 
navigable from Tiga Lake.

Challenges
The main challenges to this important ecosystem is poaching, overgrazing, kidnapping, land encroachment and the lackadaisical attitude of state government to the socioecological values of this ecosystem which rarely found in dryland areas.

References

Game Reserves of Nigeria